Nová Včelnice (until 1950 Nový Etynk-Včelnice) is a town in Jindřichův Hradec District in the South Bohemian Region of the Czech Republic. It has about 2,200 inhabitants.

Geography
It lies in the Křemešník Highlands. The town is situated on the Kamenice River. There are several ponds in the municipal territory.

History
The first written mention of Včelnice is from 1360. In 1649, the estate was bought by Spanish nobleman Bartholomew Paradys de la Saga. His wife Hypolity of Ladron had a chapel built nearby with a copy of a statuette of Black Madonna from Altötting. Her son had built 54 houses around the chapel and sold them to craftsmen. Thus, he turned a pilgrimage site into a large craft village named Neuötting/Nový Etynk.

In the 18th century, Nový Etynk grew and guilds were founded. In 1786, the chapel was rebuilt into the Church of the Assumption of the Virgin Mary. Nový Etynk-Včelnice was promoted to a market town in 1790 and to a town in 1884. In the 1930s, it lost the town title. In 1950, the market town was renamed to Nová Včelnice. The title of a town was returned to Nová Včelnice in 1998.

Sights
The landmark of the town is the Church of the Assumption of the Virgin Mary from 1786.

Notable people
Rudolf Hrušínský (1920–1994), actor
Luděk Munzar (1933–2019), actor
Miloslav Topinka (born 1945), poet and essayist

Twin towns – sister cities

Nová Včelnice is twinned with:
 Eggiwil, Switzerland
 Neuötting, Germany

References

External links

 

Populated places in Jindřichův Hradec District
Cities and towns in the Czech Republic